The Garib Rath ("Poor's chariot") is a no-frills air-conditioned train started by the Indian Railways in 2005 to provide subsidized price air-conditioned long-distance travel to passengers who could not afford standard fares of air-conditioned class in regular-fare trains. As the fares are less than two-thirds of the fares for air-conditioned classes in other trains, the distance between each seat or berth is less, the seats and berths are narrower and each coach has more seats and berths than in air-conditioned coaches in other trains.

Only seating and three-tier (78 seats) accommodation is provided in these trains. The passengers are not provided with free bedding or food. It is significantly faster and has higher priority than Superfast Express trains. Even some garib raths like H.Nizamudin Bandra Garib Rath, Chennai Garib Rath, Ranchi Garib Rath, etc. get as much priority as Rajdhani trains on there routes. The maximum speed of Garib Rath trains is 130 km/h which is at par with Rajdhanis and Duronto. The maiden journey of the train started from Saharsa, Bihar to Amritsar, Punjab (Saharsa–Amritsar Garib Rath Express).

Active routes

Defunct routes

 02709 Gudur Secunderabad Garibrath Express. 
 Rake Sharing With Secunderabad Yesvantpur Garibrath Express
 12255/56 Yesvantpur–Puducherry Garib Rath Express service converted to ordinary service
 0605/0606 Chennai CST Garibrath

See also

References

Further reading

External links

Garibrath & Yuva Train Names (archived from Indian Railways website)
List of Garib Rath trains India Rail Info

2005 establishments in India
Railway services introduced in 2005